Greatest Hits, also known as Greatest Hits Volume 1, is a greatest hits album by Welsh rockabilly singer Shakin' Stevens, released in November 1984. Three singles were released from the album, all of which were Top-20 hits. The album peaked at number 8 for four weeks on the UK Albums Chart and was certified platinum by the BFI. The album was released on CD in 2001 by Sony Music.

Track listing

Charts

Certifications and sales

References

1984 greatest hits albums
Shakin' Stevens albums
Epic Records compilation albums